Luigina is a feminine Italian given name. Notable people with the name include:

Luigina Bissoli (born 1956), Italian cyclist
Luigina Giavotti (1916–1976), Italian gymnast
Luigina Perversi (1914–1983), Italian gymnast

Italian feminine given names